Poison Video Hits is the seventh music DVD from the glam metal band Poison released in 2005, it follows the release of The Best of Ballads & Blues: Greatest hits 2 album, and it consists of six Poison video hits.

Track listing
 Cry Tough
 I Want Action
 Nothin' but a Good Time
 Fallen Angel
 Every Rose Has Its Thorn
 Unskinny Bop

Band members
 Bret Michaels - lead vocals
 C.C. DeVille - lead guitar
 Bobby Dall - bass
 Rikki Rockett - drums

External links
Official website

2005 video albums
Music video compilation albums
Poison (American band) video albums
2005 compilation albums